

Events
 1593–1594 – Diomedes Cato goes with King Sigismund to Sweden, where his fame as a lutenist and composer is large.
 Johann (Johannes) Christoph Demantius,  German poet/composer and music theorist, receives a degree from the University of Wittenberg.
 English composer William Byrd moves to Essex.
 Peter Philips moves to Amsterdam, and probably meets Jan Pieterszoon Sweelinck in this year.

Music published
Raffaella Aleotti
Sacrae cantiones, book 1 (Venice: Ricciardo Amadino)
Ghirlanda de madrigali (Garland of madrigals) (Venice: Giacomo Vincenti)
Blasius Amon – ... (Munich: Adam Berg), published posthumously
Giammateo Asola –  for six voices (Venice:Ricciardo Amadino), also includes a Magnificat
Ippolito Baccusi – Fourth book of masses for five and nine voices (Venice: Angelo Gardano)
Lodovico Bellanda – First book of canzonettas for three voices (Venice: Ricciardo Amadino)
Girolamo Belli – Third book of madrigals for six voices (Venice: Ricciardo Amadino)
Giulio Belli
Second book of madrigals for five and six voices (Venice: Ricciardo Amadino)
Second book of canzonettas for four voices (Venice: Ricciardo Amadino)
Fabrizio Dentice – Lamentations for five voices (Milan: Francesco & Simon Tini)
Girolamo Diruta –  (Venice: Giacomo Vincenti), a treatise on organ playing, including tablatures of original pieces and pieces by various composers
Johannes Eccard –    (Königsberg: Georg Osterberg), wedding music
Andrea Gabrieli & Giovanni Gabrieli –  (Venice: Angelo Gardano), published posthumously for Andrea
Bartholomäus Gesius – Psalm 112 for five voices (Frankfurt (Oder): Friedrich Hartmann), a wedding motet
Ruggiero Giovannelli
First book of motets for five and eight voices (Rome: Francesco Coattino)
Second book of madrigals for five voices (Venice: Angelo Gardano)
Rinaldo del Mel – Second book of madrigals for six voices (Venice: Giacomo Vincenti)
Claudio Merulo – Second book of madrigals for six voices (Venice: Angelo Gardano)
Philippe de Monte
 for five voices (Venice: Angelo Gardano)
Sixteenth book of madrigals for five voices (Venice: Angelo Gardano)
Thomas Morley – Canzonets. Or Little Short Songs To Three Voyces (London: Thomas Este)
Giovanni Maria Nanino – First book of canzonettas for three voices (Venice: Angelo Gardano)
Giovanni Pierluigi da Palestrina publishes a collection of Offertoria, his last publication.
Benedetto Pallavicino – Fifth book of madrigals to five voices (Venice: Giacomo Vincenti)

Music composed
 Franco-Flemish Renaissance master Orlande de Lassus began composing Lagrime di San Pietro (1593–1594), dedicated to Pope Clement VIII: it was the final work of Lassus and considered, by some, the absolute summit of the 16th-century Italian madrigal. It would be completed early in 1594, and published in 1595.

Births 
April 3 – George Herbert, poet, orator, hymnist (d. 1633)
September 20 – Gottfried Scheidt, organist and composer (d. 1661)
date unknown – Claudia Rusca, composer, singer, and organist (d. 1676)

Deaths 
February – Nicolao Dorati, trombone player and composer (b. 1513)
date unknown – 
Count Mario Bevilacqua, patron of music and collector of instruments (b. 1536)
Lodovico Bassano (buried 18 July), London wind player and composer

References

 
Music
16th century in music
Music by year